Arnold is an unincorporated community in Jerome Township, Union County, Ohio, United States.

History
In 1893, a railroad station was built and a community platted on land owned by Mrs. George Arnold along the Toledo and Ohio Central Railroad. The station was originally called New California, but the name was changed when they applied for a post office. The Arnold Post office was established on June 21, 1894, with James Arnold as the original Postmaster. Arnold closed his grocery store, and the post office was abandoned in 1896. Fred Smith was then commissioned as Postmaster, but closed his business also before he could perform any of the duties of the office. Mrs. Carrie Fleck was the next Postmaster, when she and her husband established a store in the community later in 1896. She continued her duties until the branch was discontinued on February 28, 1910. As of 1913, Mr. & Mrs. Fleck's store had continued to grow, and there was also another grocery store, an axe handle factory, two warehouses, the railroad station, 24 houses, and a population of about 100.

References 

Unincorporated communities in Union County, Ohio
Unincorporated communities in Ohio